Universalist National Memorial Church (UNMC) is a Unitarian Universalist church located at 1810 16th Street, Northwest in the Dupont Circle vicinage of Washington, D.C. Theologically, the church describes itself as "both liberal Christian and Universalist". Originally a member of the Universalist Church of America, it became a member of the Unitarian Universalist Association (UUA) in 1961 when the former merged with the American Unitarian Association to form the UUA, and in 2003, UNMC strengthened its ties to the UUA.

History

Universalist ministers visited the Washington area from at least 1827, and in the late 1860s, Universalists began organizing a permanent church. In 1869, The Murray Universalist Society was founded, named in honor of the centenary of John Murray's arrival in North America and the Church of Our Father (First Universalist Church of Washington, D.C.) was founded the following year.

Universalist National Memorial Church was established to serve as the official representative in Washington, DC, of the Universalist General Convention, later known as the Universalist Church of America. In 1921, the Universalist General Convention approved funding for construction of the church. The first services were held in 1925, although at a different location than the present facility. The first service at Universalist National Memorial Church on 16th Street, NW was held on Palm Sunday 1930, with Frederick Williams Perkins as its first minister.

Architecture
UNMC is an example of Romanesque Revival architecture and was designed by Charles Collins and Francis Allen, architects of the Riverside Church in New York City. The four-story building, a contributing property to the Sixteenth Street Historic District, features a stained-glass window and a stone tower that reaches a height of 98 feet (30 m).

Affiliations

UNMC is a member of the following organizations:

American Unitarian Conference
Christian Universalist Association
Center for Progressive Christianity
National Association of Congregational Christian Churches
Unitarian Universalist Association

In 2003, UNMC hosted the Revival conference of the Unitarian Universalist Christian Fellowship.

Ministers
Church of Our Father (First Universalist Church of Washington, D.C.)
Rev. A. C. Barry: February–May 1870
Rev. C. H. Day: 1873–1877
Rev. Alexander Kent: 1877–1890
Rev. A. A. Whitcomb: 1890–1892
Rev. A. G. Rogers: 1892–1897
Rev. Leslie Moore: 1897–1899
Dr. John van Schaick Jr.: 1900–1918; emeritus: 1923–1949
Rev. William Couden (acting): 1917–1918
Dr. Levi M. Powers: 1919–1920
Dr. John van Schaick Jr.: 1920–1922
Dr. Clarence Rice: 1922–1926
Dr. Fredrick W. Perkins: 1927–1930

Universalist National Memorial Church
Dr. Fredrick W. Perkins: 1930–1939
Dr. Seth R. Brooks: 1939–1978; emeritus: 1978–1987
Dr. William L. Fox: 1978-1988
Rev. James Blair: 1989–1993
Dr. William L. Fox: 1993–1998; current emeritus
Rev. Vanessa R. Southern: associate, 1995–1998; sole pastor: 1998–2000
Rev. Scott Wells: 2000–2004
Rev. Lillie Mae Henley: 2006–2011
Crystal Lewis: 2014–2016
David Gatton: 2014–present

References

External links

 The historical records of the Universalist National Memorial Church are in the Andover-Harvard Theological Library at Harvard Divinity School in Cambridge, Massachusetts.

Dupont Circle
Historic district contributing properties in Washington, D.C.
Churches completed in 1930
Christian organizations established in 1921
Romanesque Revival church buildings in Washington, D.C.
Unitarian Universalist churches in Washington, D.C.
20th-century Unitarian Universalist church buildings
Universalist Church of America churches
1921 establishments in Washington, D.C.
Churches on the National Register of Historic Places in Washington, D.C.